For the Indian media company TVF, see: The Viral Fever.

TVF Media is an independent multimedia company located in central London.  It was launched in 1983 by Hilary Lawson as Television and Film Productions plc.

It features television programming, international distribution, post production, communications for the healthcare and educational sectors, and video art.

TVF was described by the Hereford Times as "the UK's leading distributor of documentaries."

Notes and references

External links 
 TVF Media official web site

Film production companies of the United Kingdom